Geertgen is a given name. Notable people with the name include:

 Geertgen tot Sint Jans ( 1465– 1495), Early Netherlandish painter
 Geertgen Wyntges (1636–1712), Dutch Golden Age flower painter

See also
 Geertsen

Dutch masculine given names